is a Japanese professional wrestler, currently signed to the Pro Wrestling Noah promotion where he is the former GHC Heavyweight Champion in a record breaking fifth reign. He made his debut for the promotion in July 2004 and remained with it until the end of 2012. In January 2013, Shiozaki joined All Japan Pro Wrestling (AJPW), where he became a one-time Triple Crown Heavyweight Champion and a two-time World Tag Team Champion, before resigning from the promotion in September 2015. Afterwards, he returned to Noah, where, in May 2016, he won the GHC Heavyweight Championship for the third time. He has also worked for American promotions Ring of Honor (ROH) and Full Impact Pro (FIP), winning the latter's World Heavyweight Championship. In August 2016, Shiozaki was appointed the chairman of Noah's wrestlers' association.

Early life 
Go was born as the third and youngest child in the family, with one older brother and sister. Due to the influence of his older brother who was a professional wrestling fan, he began to watch professional wrestling, especially All Japan Pro-Wrestling on TV from the second grade of elementary school, and became a fan of the Super Generation Army.

In youth he would play baseball, which he started in the third grade of elementary school, he served as a catcher who was assigned the 4th and 5th batters  and won the eastern district of Kumamoto, his hometown. Similarly, in elementary school, he played against Miho Koga ,a female professional golfer who was the fourth baseball player in Ace and later became a junior in the first grade of Tokai University, in a youth baseball game . At Kumamoto City Nishihara Junior High School  , he joined the basketball club, served as a center forward in the position, and was appointed captain in the third year. Even after going on to high school, he continued to play basketball, becoming a regular player from the second year and achieving the best four in Kumamoto Prefecture  .

After graduating from high school, he failed to take the police recruitment exam and lived a freeter life while attending a civil servant prep school. One day, he heard on TV that Mitsuharu Misawa, the founder of Pro Wrestling Noah said, "Anyone can be a professional wrestler if he has the guts."  One day while reading the back of the "Weekly Wrestling" magazine, he saw an article about Kenta Koabayashi (later KENTA). The article would mention that Kobayashi had passed the AJPW rookie test, without having any background in martial arts, something Shiozaki was lacking as well. Go would later mention that this article would inspire him, and this was when he began thinking of becoming a professional wrestler.

Professional wrestling career

Pro Wrestling Noah (2003–2012)
Shiozaki entered the Pro Wrestling Noah dojo in 2003 and according to the commentators from the event Universal Uproar, was the only man to graduate in his class as well as being the youngest wrestler on the roster. Following his debut, Shiozaki became a protégé of the legendary Kenta Kobashi. Shiozaki and Kobashi formed a very successful tag team and the biggest match the two had as a team was a losing effort against Kensuke Sasaki and his own protégé, Katsuhiko Nakajima. The match reached critical acclaim, being given a near-perfect rating from the Wrestling Observer Newsletter.

In the beginning of 2006, Shiozaki fractured his jaw against Kenta. Following his recovery, he began wrestling matches against the biggest names of the company and despite losing to them, he would put forth a valiant effort against them, similar to how Kobashi competed in All Japan Pro Wrestling. After Kobashi was forced out of action due to cancer, Shiozaki teamed briefly with Tamon Honda but was again defeated by Noah's top wrestlers until he finally broke his losing streak by pinning Ricky Marvin.

In late April 2007, Shiozaki represented Noah in the prestigious King of Europe Cup. He defeated Real Quality Wrestling representative Martin Stone in the first round before falling to Pro Wrestling Guerrilla representative Davey Richards in the quarterfinals.

Shiozaki returned to Noah in mid-2009 and gained a significant push as Mitsuharu Misawa's new tag team partner. They soon won the Global Tag League in May and thus became the top contenders to the GHC Tag Team Championship. During their title match on June 13 against champions Akitoshi Saito and Bison Smith, Misawa suffered a cervical spinal cord trauma during the match after receiving a belly to back suplex from Saito. After Misawa remained motionless following the suplex, officials quickly tended to him before he was taken to a hospital, where he died later on.

On June 14, reigning GHC Heavyweight Champion Jun Akiyama was forced to vacate the title due to herniated discs in his back. As a result, Shiozaki was nominated by Akiyama to wrestle for the title against the number one contender Takeshi Rikio. After a hard-fought twenty-minute match, Shiozaki managed to defeat Rikio to become the new GHC Heavyweight Champion. He then went on to successfully defend his title for the first time on September 27 against Akitoshi Saito. However his second title defense was unsuccessful as on December 6, Shiozaki lost the World Heavyweight title to Takashi Sugiura on the last date of the 2009 Winter Navigation tour. On May 23, 2010 Shiozaki teamed up with Atsushi Aoki to defeat Takeshi Morishima and Taiji Ishimori to win the AAA World Tag Team Championship during Pro Wrestling Noah's Navigation with Breeze show in Niigata, Niigata, Japan. As a result of the victory, Shiozaki and Aoki were scheduled to defend the title during AAA's Triplemania XVIII show. At TripleMania, Shiozaki and Aoki were the first team eliminated when Joe Lider pinned Shiozaki. The match and the title were ultimately won by Los Maniacos (Silver Cain and Último Gladiador). In August 2010 Shiozaki took part in New Japan Pro-Wrestling's 2010 G1 Climax tournament, where he won four out of his seven-round robin stage matches, only to narrowly miss the finals of the tournament after wrestling Shinsuke Nakamura to a 30-minute time limit draw on the final day of the tournament. The draw with Nakamura led to a No Time Limit match at a Pro Wrestling Noah show on August 22, where Shiozaki was victorious. Shiozaki and Nakamura had their third match on January 4, 2011, at New Japan's Wrestle Kingdom V in Tokyo Dome, where Nakamura was victorious. Shiozaki regained the GHC Heavyweight Title by defeating Takashi Sugiura on July 10, 2011. On January 4, 2012, Shiozaki returned to New Japan at Wrestle Kingdom VI in Tokyo Dome, where he and Naomichi Marufuji defeated CHAOS Top Team (Shinsuke Nakamura and Toru Yano) in a tag team match. On January 22, Shiozaki lost the GHC Heavyweight Championship to Takeshi Morishima. On October 26, Shiozaki and Akitoshi Saito defeated Kenta and Maybach Taniguchi to win the GHC Tag Team Championship. On December 3, 2012, it was reported that Shiozaki had threatened to not re-sign with Noah after his contract expires in January 2013, when the promotion decided to release Kenta Kobashi from his contract. Six days later, Shiozaki and Saito lost the GHC Tag Team Championship to Naomichi Marufuji and Takashi Sugiura. On December 19, Noah confirmed that Shiozaki would be leaving the promotion following December 24. On December 24, Shiozaki defeated Taiji Ishimori in his final Noah match.

Foreign excursions (2006–2009) 
Shiozaki made his Ring of Honor (ROH) debut during ROH's August 2006 tour of England. In July 2007, he wrestled Bryan Danielson in ROH's debut show in Tokyo, Japan. He unsuccessfully wrestled ROH World Champion Nigel McGuinness in a title match on a Noah show in January 2008 before joining the ROH roster as a regular during February's event Eye of the Storm.

On June 6, 2008, Shiozaki participated in a one night tournament to crown new ROH World Tag Team Champions. He and partner World Champion Nigel McGuiness were eliminated in the first round by Kevin Steen and El Generico when Steen forced McGuiness to submit to the sharpshooter. The following day, Shiozaki received a title shot against McGuiness but lost when McGuiness forced him to submit to the London Dungeon. On June 28, Shiozaki revealed himself to be the newest member of Sweet 'n' Sour Inc., Larry Sweeney's heel stable.

In the summer of 2008, Shiozaki began performing for ROH's sister promotion, Full Impact Pro (FIP), based in Florida. He defeated Erick Stevens for the World Heavyweight Championship at FIP's event Heatstroke on August 23. He would hold the belt for four months, defending it on both FIP and ROH, before losing it to Tyler Black on December 20.

Soon after having a tryout match with World Wrestling Entertainment on September 5, Shiozaki began wrestling in Harley Race's World League Wrestling, where he also underwent further training under Race. On October 4, he won the WLW World Heavyweight Championship for the first time in a nine-man Battle Royal for the vacant title. He later lost title to four-time WLW World Heavyweight Champion Luminous Warrior on May 19, 2009.

All Japan Pro Wrestling (2013–2015) 

On January 26, 2013, Shiozaki, Atsushi Aoki, Jun Akiyama, Kotaro Suzuki and Yoshinobu Kanemaru, all of whom had quit Noah at the same time, announced that they had joined All Japan Pro Wrestling (AJPW), forming the "Burning" stable. On March 17, Shiozaki and Akiyama defeated Get Wild (Manabu Soya and Takao Omori) to win the World Tag Team Championship. On May 11, Shiozaki made a one-night return to Noah to take part in Kenta Kobashi's retirement match at Final Burning in Budokan, where he, Kenta, Maybach Taniguchi and Yoshinobu Kanemaru were defeated by Kobashi, Jun Akiyama, Keiji Mutoh and Kensuke Sasaki. On July 5, following a mass exodus led by Keiji Mutoh, it was announced that Shiozaki, along with the rest of Burning, had signed an exclusive contract with All Japan. Afterwards, Shiozaki set his sights on the Triple Crown Heavyweight Championship, defeating reigning champion Suwama in a non-title Two Out of Three Falls match on July 14, the launching day of the post-Mutoh All Japan. Shiozaki received his shot at the title on August 25, but was defeated by Suwama. In September, Shiozaki made it to the finals of the 2013 Ōdō Tournament, after wins over Burning stablemates Kotaro Suzuki and Yoshinobu Kanemaru as well as top World Tag Team Championship contender Joe Doering, before losing to Akebono. On October 22, Shiozaki and Akiyama lost the World Tag Team Championship to Evolution (Joe Doering and Suwama). The following day, Shiozaki announced that he wanted to leave Burning in order to win the Triple Crown. On November 18, Shiozaki announced that he was forming a new stable named "Xceed", revealing Kenso as the first member of the group. However, in the stable's first match three days later, Kenso turned on Shiozaki and aligned himself with Bambi Killer and D'Lo Brown. Shiozaki was then saved by Atsushi Aoki, Kento Miyahara and Kotaro Suzuki, who became the newest members of Xceed. In December, Shiozaki and Miyahara made it to the finals of the 2013 World's Strongest Tag Determination League, before losing to Evolution (Joe Doering and Suwama). On February 23, 2014, Shiozaki received another shot at the Triple Crown Heavyweight Championship, but was defeated by the defending champion, Akebono. In April, Shiozaki participated in the 2014 Champion Carnival, where he was leading his block before suffering a broken thumb, which forced him to pull out of the tournament and forfeit his final round-robin match with Jun Akiyama.

On September 28, Shiozaki defeated Suwama in the finals to win the 2014 Ōdō Tournament and earn another shot at the Triple Crown Heavyweight Championship. Shiozaki received his title shot on October 29, but was defeated by Joe Doering. Shiozaki received a rematch with Doering on January 3, 2015, and defeated him to win the Triple Crown Heavyweight Championship for the first time. He made his first successful title defense on February 7 against Zeus. His second successful defense took place on March 27 against Xceed stablemate Kento Miyahara. On May 6, Shiozaki and Miyahara defeated Yutaka Yoshie and Shiozaki's next Triple Crown Heavyweight Championship challenger Akebono to become the new World Tag Team Champions. By simultaneously holding the Triple Crown Heavyweight Championship and the World Tag Team Championship, Shiozaki became the seventh "Quintuple Crown Champion". On May 21, Shiozaki lost the Triple Crown Heavyweight Championship to Akebono in his third defense. On September 28, it was announced that Shiozaki was leaving AJPW the following month and becoming a freelancer. The announcement also led to Shiozaki and Miyahara vacating the World Tag Team Championship. Shiozaki's final AJPW match took place on October 4, when he and Miyahara defeated Jun Akiyama and Yoshinobu Kanemaru in a tag team match.

Return to Noah (2015–present) 
On November 20, 2015, Shiozaki returned to Noah, announcing he wanted to again wrestle in his original home promotion. His interview segment was interrupted by Minoru Suzuki, who offered him a spot in his Suzuki-gun stable. On November 26, Shiozaki defeated Mitsuhiro Kitamiya in his Noah return match. When Takashi Sugiura turned on Noah and joined Suzuki-gun on December 23, Shiozaki announced that he wanted to join the promotion in its battle with Suzuki-gun. Naomichi Marufuji, however, turned his offer down. On January 31, 2016, Shiozaki's tag team partner Yoshinobu Kanemaru turned on him and joined Suzuki-gun. At the end of the show, Marufuji, after losing the GHC Heavyweight Championship to Sugiura, finally accepted Shiozaki's help in the war between Noah and Suzuki-gun. On May 28, Shiozaki defeated Sugiura to win the GHC Heavyweight Championship for the third time. Shiozaki made his first successful title defense on June 12 against Suzuki-gun member Shelton X Benjamin. The following day, Shiozaki officially re-signed with Noah, ending his days as a freelancer. On July 30, Shiozaki lost the GHC Heavyweight Championship back to Sugiura. On December 3, Shiozaki and Maybach Taniguchi defeated K.E.S. (Davey Boy Smith Jr. and Lance Archer) to win the GHC Tag Team Championship. They lost the title to Kenoh and Masa Kitamiya on January 21, 2017. Shiozaki regained the title with new partner Atsushi Kotoge on August 26, losing it to Muhammad Yone and Quiet Storm on October 1.

On April 29, 2018, Shiozaki and Kaito Kiyomiya won the GHC Tag Team Championship from The Aggression (Katsuhiko Nakajima and Masa Kitamiya), but lost the titles back to them in their first defense exactly one month later. On August 18, he unsuccessfully challenged Takashi Sugiura for the GHC Heavyweight Championship. Go Shiozaki took part of the 2018 Global League, winning 4 matches and losing 3, making 8 points and failing to advance to the finals. However, after Naomichi Marufuji and Akitoshi Saito vacated the GHC Tag Team Championship, Shiozaki formed a team with Katsuhiko Nakajima, and together, they defeated Cody Hall and Maybach Taniguchi in the first round, and Kenoh and Masa Kitamiya at the finals, capturing the titles. They would lose the titles 9 days later against Maybach Taniguchi and a debuting Yuji Hino. They had their rematch on January 6, but they failed to regain the titles. Muhammed Yone and Quiet Storm would defeat the team of Taniguchi and Hino and become the new Tag Champions, after the match, Shiozaki and Nakajima challenged the new champions to a title match, and they accepted. The match took place on February 24, and Shiozaki and Nakajima won the match, winning the titles once again. After the match, Eddie Edwards and Masa Kitamiya came to the ring and challenged the new champions, this led to a title match on March 10, which the team of Shiozaki and Nakajima won, retaining their titles.

Championships and accomplishments 
 All Japan Pro Wrestling
 Triple Crown Heavyweight Championship (1 time)
 World Tag Team Championship (2 times) – with Jun Akiyama (1) and Kento Miyahara (1)
 Ōdō Tournament (2014)
 Full Impact Pro
 FIP World Heavyweight Championship (1 time)
 Lucha Libre AAA Worldwide
 AAA World Tag Team Championship (1 time) – with Atsushi Aoki
Nikkan Sports
Outstanding Performance Award (2009)
 Pro Wrestling Illustrated
 Ranked No. 31 of the top 500 singles wrestlers in the PWI 500 in 2015
 Pro Wrestling Noah
 GHC Heavyweight Championship (5 times)
 GHC Tag Team Championship (7 times) – with Akitoshi Saito (1), Maybach Taniguchi (1), Atsushi Kotoge (1), Kaito Kiyomiya (1), and Katsuhiko Nakajima (3)
 Global Tag League (2009) – with Mitsuharu Misawa
 Global Tag League (2018) – with Kaito Kiyomiya
 One Night Six-Man Tag Team Tournament (2007) – with Naomichi Marufuji and Ippei Ota
 Tokyo Sports
 Best Bout Award (2021) 
 Outstanding Performance Award (2020)
 World League Wrestling
 WLW Heavyweight Championship (1 time)

References

External links 

 All Japan Pro Wrestling profile 

Japanese male professional wrestlers
Living people
People from Kumamoto
1982 births
FIP World Heavyweight Champions
GHC Heavyweight Champions
GHC Tag Team Champions
AAA World Tag Team Champions
World Tag Team Champions (AJPW)
Triple Crown Heavyweight Champions